Franz Held (born 6 May 1948) is a German rower who competed for West Germany in the 1968 Summer Olympics and in the 1972 Summer Olympics.

Held was born in Passau.

In 1968, Held and his partner, Günther Karl, finished twelfth in the coxless pair event. He competed at the 1971 European Rowing Championships and won a bronze medal with the coxless four. At the 1972 Summer Olympics in Munich, he was a crew member of the West German boat that won the bronze medal in the coxless four event.

References 

1948 births
Living people
Olympic rowers of West Germany
Rowers at the 1968 Summer Olympics
Rowers at the 1972 Summer Olympics
Olympic bronze medalists for West Germany
Olympic medalists in rowing
West German male rowers
Medalists at the 1972 Summer Olympics
People from Passau
Sportspeople from Lower Bavaria
European Rowing Championships medalists